Derwent is an unincorporated community in central Valley Township, Guernsey County, Ohio, United States.  It is located near the southern border of Guernsey and Noble counties.

Derwent lies in southeastern Ohio, a part of the Unglaciated Allegheny Plateau region. It is located about seven miles from Senecaville Lake. Major cities nearby include Zanesville and Marietta.

The Penn Central rail line ran through the eastern portion of Derwent (heading south to Marietta) and which crossed the Baltimore and Ohio rail line ran immediately to the south, heading toward Cumberland, Ohio and which eventually terminated at the Muskingum Electric Railroad. The former Penn Central line is in the process of being rebuilt by the Byesville Scenic Railway.

History
Derwent was platted in 1898.

References

Unincorporated communities in Ohio
Unincorporated communities in Guernsey County, Ohio